Jan Busiński (died on 20 January 1541) was a Roman Catholic prelate who served as Auxiliary Bishop of Gniezno (1527–1541).

Biography
On 11 Jan 1527, Jan Busiński was appointed during the papacy of Pope Clement VII as Auxiliary Bishop of Gniezno and Titular Bishop of Athyra. He served as Auxiliary Bishop of Gniezno until his death on 20 January 1541.

References 

16th-century Roman Catholic bishops in Poland
1541 deaths
Bishops appointed by Pope Clement VII